is a railway station of the Chūō Main Line, East Japan Railway Company (JR East) in Ōtsuki, Yamanashi Prefecture, Japan.

Lines
Enzan Station is served by the Chūō Main Line / Chūō Rapid Line, and is  77.6 kilometers from the terminus of the line at Tokyo Station.

Station layout
The station consists of one ground level island platform, connected to the station building by a footbridge. The station is unattended.

Platforms

Station history
Yanagawa Station was opened on April 1, 1949, as a passenger station on the Japanese National Railways (JNR) Chūō Main Line. It has been unattended since March 1, 1985. With the dissolution and privatization of the JNR on April 1, 1987, the station came under the control of the East Japan Railway Company. The station building was rebuilt in November 1990 in a log-cabin style after a fire destroyed the former building. Automated turnstiles using the Suica IC Card system came into operation from November 18, 2001.

Passenger statistics
In fiscal 2010, the station was used by an average of 227 passengers daily (boarding passengers only).

Surrounding area
former Yanagawa village hall

See also
 List of railway stations in Japan

References

 Miyoshi Kozo. Chuo-sen Machi to eki Hyaku-niju nen. JT Publishing (2009)

External links

Official home page.

Railway stations in Yamanashi Prefecture
Railway stations in Japan opened in 1949
Chūō Main Line
Stations of East Japan Railway Company
Ōtsuki, Yamanashi